Soviet submarine K-3 may refer to one of the following submarines of the Soviet Navy:

 , a K-class submarine sunk by German vessels in March 1943

Russian Navy ship names
Soviet Navy ship names